The Chief of the Navy is the Commander–in–chief of the Royal Norwegian Navy.

The Chief of the Navy is head over the Naval Staff, the Coast Guard, The Fleet and the main naval bases. Presiding over close to 3600 soldiers, the Chief of the Navy has great responsibility to lead and defend. With the seas under his discretion, the Chief of the Navy watches over the seas which are seven times greater in area than that of Norway's mainland.

The Naval Staff is based at Haakonsvern Naval Base in Bergen, western Norway.

Name of the position 
 1970 - 2017: General inspector of the Navy
 2017 - today: Chief of the Navy

List of chiefs

Commanding Admiral

Chief of the Navy

General Inspector for the Navy
 1970–1974: Hans Skjong
 1974–1976: 
 1976–1980: Charles Oluf Herlofson
 1980–1983: Roy Breivik
 1983–1989: Bjarne Grimstvedt
 1989–1992: 
 1992–1995: 
 1995–2000: Hans Kristian Svensholt
 2000–2003: Kjell-Birger Olsen
 2003–2008: 
 2008–2011: Haakon Bruun-Hanssen
 2011–2014: 
 2014–2017:

Chief of the Navy

References

Norway
Royal Norwegian Navy admirals
Norway